"Bojangles" is a song by American rapper Pitbull. It was released in May 2006 as the lead single from his album El Mariel. It was produced by Lil Jon. The remix features Lil Jon and the Ying Yang Twins. It featured a controversial video featuring the Ying Yang Twins and Lil Jon.

Content
The song references a line by one of the Ying Yang Twins, "a Bojangles is a girl with breast, legs and wings", in turn taking the name from the fast food chain Bojangles' Famous Chicken 'n Biscuits. Pitbull also references Jay-Z's 1996 album Reasonable Doubt in the song.

Track listing
Triple Pack

 "Bojangles"
 "Shake" Ying Yang Twins feat. Pitbull & Elephant Man
 "Culo" feat. Lil Jon & Ivy Queen

Charts

References

2006 singles
Pitbull (rapper) songs
Lil Jon songs
Ying Yang Twins songs
TVT Records singles
Dirty rap songs
Music videos directed by Marcus Raboy
Song recordings produced by Lil Jon
Songs written by Lil Jon
Songs written by Pitbull (rapper)
2006 songs
Crunk songs